Hindaråvåg or Hinderåvåg is a village in Tysvær municipality in Rogaland county, Norway. The village is located along the Nedstrandsfjorden, on the southern coast of Tysvær. The village is the site of Nedstrand Church. The Tveit Upper Secondary School is also located here. This is the only agriculture school in Rogaland county. Beautiful Zip- line park by the fjord, 19 meters highest, 
Høyt&Lavt Nedstrand. The unique panorama point Himakaanaa is only 1h 15 mins walk from the village!]

References

External links
Tveit Upper Secondary School

[http://www.hoytlavt.no/nedstrand
Beautiful Zip- line park by the fjord, 19 meters highest]

Villages in Rogaland
Tysvær